Maud Debien (born 29 May 1938 in Quebec City, Quebec) is a retired Canadian politician who served as a member of the House of Commons of Canada from 1993 to 2000. Her career has been in education.

She was elected in the Laval East electoral district under the Bloc Québécois party in the 1993 and 1997 federal elections, thus serving in the 35th and 36th Canadian Parliaments. Debien left Canadian politics in 2000 as she did not seek a third term in that year's federal election.

References
 

1938 births
Bloc Québécois MPs
Women members of the House of Commons of Canada
French Quebecers
Living people
Members of the House of Commons of Canada from Quebec
Politicians from Laval, Quebec
Politicians from Quebec City
Women in Quebec politics
20th-century Canadian politicians
20th-century Canadian women politicians